Zhao Zhizhong (born 5 December 1958) is a Chinese fencer. He competed in the individual and team épée events at the 1984 Summer Olympics.

References

1958 births
Living people
Chinese male fencers
Olympic fencers of China
Fencers at the 1984 Summer Olympics